BBC Radio Sussex is the BBC's local radio station serving the counties of East and West Sussex.

It broadcasts on FM, DAB, digital TV and via BBC Sounds from studios on Queens Road in Brighton.

Programming

Local programming airs from the BBC's Brighton studios from 6am to 10am on Mondays to Saturdays and from 2-6pm on Saturdays.

Regional programming, shared with BBC Radio Surrey, airs from 10am - 10pm on weekdays, from 10am - 2pm and 8-10pm on Saturdays and from 6am - 6pm and 10pm - 1am on Sundays.

Off-peak programming, including the weekday late show from 10pm - 1am, originates from BBC Radio Solent in Southampton and BBC Radio Berkshire in Reading.

During the station's downtime, BBC Radio Sussex simulcasts overnight programming from BBC Radio 5 Live and BBC Radio London.

According to RAJAR, BBC Radio Surrey and BBC Radio Sussex share a combined weekly audience of 248,000 listeners and a 3.9% share as of September 2021.

Sports coverage
BBC Radio Sussex covers every Brighton and Hove Albion and Crawley Town game live. On Saturdays, BBC Sussex Sport starts at 2pm, presented by Johnny Cantor from wherever Brighton are playing. This show contains interviews and features on all sports from within the county. The frequencies then split shortly before kick off, with Brighton's match on DAB, 95.0, 95.3 and 104.5FM, and Crawley on the remaining frequencies.

When non-traditional kick off times occur, the main presenter for the club in question presents a BBC Sussex sports special on midweek evenings.

Frequencies 

Analogue VHF FM
95.0 MHz - Newhaven
95.1 MHz - Horsham 
95.3 MHz - Brighton (Whitehawk Hill transmitter)
104.5 MHz - East Sussex (Heathfield transmitter)
104.8 MHz - West Sussex/South Coast (Burton Down transmitter)

DAB Digital Radio: Block 10B 211.648 MHz
Worthing (Findon transmitter)
Newhaven
Hastings
Eastbourne
Chichester (Burton Down transmitter)
Brighton (Whitehawk Hill transmitter)
Crawley (Little Prestwood Farm transmitter)
East Sussex (Heathfield transmitter)
Central Sussex (Truleigh Hill transmitter)

In addition, BBC Radio Sussex also broadcasts on Freeview TV channel 720 and streams online via BBC Sounds.

History

BBC Radio Brighton (1968–1983)

BBC Radio Brighton was one of the first wave of BBC Local Radio stations which took to the air during the late 1960s. Broadcasting from Marlborough Place, it officially opened on 14 February 1968, though a short-lived emergency service had been broadcast during the blizzards earlier that winter. Originally broadcast on 88.1 MHz VHF only, the station later acquired a medium wave frequency of 202m, and transferred to 95.3 MHz on VHF. The transmission area was initially restricted to little more than the immediate Brighton and Hove conurbation, with the surrounding suburbs. However, coverage was extended to include Worthing in the late 1970s.

In common with much of the BBC's early local radio output, Radio Brighton broadcast only for limited daytime hours in its early years, relying on Radio 2 and Radio 4 for a sustaining service, but building to a full daytime service by the mid-1970s. In the early years, the emphasis was on structured programmes rather than the open-ended magazine shows which have since become more common. The flagship was the breakfast news programme Coastwise.

BBC Radio Sussex (1983–1994)

On 22 October 1983, as part of the BBC's move to extend its local radio network across the UK, the station expanded further to include the entire county. As a result, the 'Radio Brighton' name was dropped in favour of the more accurate BBC Radio Sussex.

BBC Southern Counties Radio (1994–2009)

In 1994 BBC Radio Sussex merged with a later arrival, BBC Radio Surrey, to form BBC Southern Counties Radio. At first it ran a single all-talk schedule across Sussex and Surrey. However, in September 1997 two dedicated breakfast shows, one for Brighton and Hove on the old 95.3 frequency, and another for the remainder of Sussex, were introduced. The separate breakfast show for Brighton was discontinued in April 2006.

BBC Sussex (2009–2020)

In March 2009 the county name returned to the radio station name when BBC Sussex became the new name for BBC Southern Counties Radio across Sussex. BBC Sussex and its sister station BBC Surrey continue effectively to operate as one station, with no change in management or infrastructure from its predecessor.

BBC Radio Sussex (2020–present)
On 30 March 2020 the station reverted to its earlier name of BBC Radio Sussex.

Notable personnel

Bob Gunnell
Des Lynam
Kate Adie
Michael Fabricant
Bob Simpson 
David Arscott 
Gavin Ashenden
Roger Day

References

External links 
 BBC Radio Sussex
 Media UK - BBC Radio Sussex

Sussex
Companies based in West Sussex
Radio stations in Sussex
Organisations based in East Sussex